Peter Pau Tak-Hei (born 1952) is a Hong Kong cinematographer and film director, best known to western audiences as for his work on Crouching Tiger, Hidden Dragon, for which he won the Academy Award for Best Cinematography in 2000. One of Hong Kong's premier cinematographers, he has collaborated with directors John Woo, Ronny Yu, Ang Lee, Tsui Hark, and Wong Kar-wai.

Pau is a member of the Hong Kong Society of Cinematographers. The asteroid 34420 Peterpau was named in his honour in early 2006. His older sister is Hong Kong Film Awards best actress winner Paw Hee-Ching.

Partial filmography

External links
 
 hkcinemagic entry
 lovehkfilm entry

1951 births
Living people
Best Cinematographer Academy Award winners
Hong Kong cinematographers